The Sudbury Cubs were a Junior "A" ice hockey team from Sudbury, Ontario, Canada.  They are a part of the Northern Ontario Junior Hockey League.

History
The North Stars jumped from juvenile with the Coniston Flyers and Nickel Centre Native Sons to Junior B in 1976.

In 1978, they were promoted to Jr. A as members of the Northern Ontario Junior Hockey League.

Season-by-season results

Notable alumni
Todd Bertuzzi
Brian Savage
Sean Gagnon

External links
NOJHL Webpage

Northern Ontario Junior Hockey League teams
Sports teams in Greater Sudbury